Cerithiopsis antemunda is a species of very small sea snails, marine gastropod molluscs in the family Cerithiopsidae. It was described by Bartsch in 1911.

References

antemunda
Gastropods described in 1911